Channel Islands National Park consists of five of the eight Channel Islands off the Pacific coast of the U.S. state of California. Although the islands are close to the shore of the densely populated state, they have been relatively undeveloped. The park covers 249,561 acres (100,994 ha), of which 79,019 acres (31,978 ha) are federal land. The Nature Conservancy owns and manages 76% of Santa Cruz Island, the largest of the eight.

The islands are home to significant natural and cultural resources, resulting in several designations. Anacapa and Santa Barbara islands were made a national monument in 1938. All eight islands became a biosphere reserve under UNESCO in 1976. And five — Anacapa, Santa Barbara, Santa Cruz, San Miguel and Santa Rosa — were made constituent to the new national park on March 5, 1980. Of these, all but Anacapa are in Santa Barbara County, the latter being in Ventura County.

Channel Islands National Marine Sanctuary encompasses the waters six nautical miles around Channel Islands National Park.

Park purpose
As stated in the foundation document:

History 
Radiocarbon dating of a fire area near Arlington Canyon on the northwest coast of Santa Rosa Island shows human habitation from at least 37,000 years BP, while a burned mammoth bone was dated at 30,000 years BP.  Similar fire areas in the same vicinity were dated at 27,000 years BP and 17,000 years BP, also believed to have been made by man.  Additionally, a burned dwarf mammoth in a shell midden was dated to 12,500 years BP.  A fire pit in a midden-humus layer was dated at 11,900 years BP, while above this layer was a stone chopper with a butchered and burned mammoth dated 11,800 years BP.  Several more fire areas were dated at 11,000 years BP, while human bones, Arlington Springs Man, are dated to 10,000 years BP.  A circular fishhook was dated at 4,800 years BP.  Huge shell mounds appear at 2,000 years BP, while a camp fire in Skull Gulch was dated at 330 years BP.

Juan Rodríguez Cabrillo first observed the islands in 1542. The three northern channel islands were inhabited by an estimated two to three thousand Chumash, with eleven villages on Santa Cruz, eight on Santa Rosa, and two on San Miguel. In 1938 the Santa Barbara and Anacapa islands were designated a national monument. San Miguel, Santa Rosa and Santa Cruz islands were combined with the monument in 1980 to form modern-day Channel Islands National Park.

Oil spill 
The resulting spill was, at the time, the largest oil spill to occur in United States territorial waters. Following the spill, tides carried the oil onto the beaches of the Anacapa, San Miguel, Santa Rosa and Santa Cruz islands.

This spill had a large impact on native wildlife of the Channel Islands. Much of the islands' seabird population was affected, with over an estimated 3,600 avians killed. Meanwhile, seals, dolphins and other sea life died and washed ashore on both the islands and the mainland.

This spill is the third largest oil spill in the United States, only surpassed by the Deepwater Horizon and the Exxon Valdez oil spills. It resulted in a  expansion of the Department of the Interior buffer zone in the channel and contributed to the formation of the Environmental Protection Agency.

The State of California Department of Oil and Gas noted 29 natural oil seeps between Point Conception and Rincon Point.  The seeps were first noted by Father Pedro Font in 1776.  Additionally, tar mounds are concentrated off the coast at Point Conception, Coal Oil Point, and Carpinteria.  A natural oil seep also exists off the west coast of San Miguel Island.  Finally, the distinctive odor of the petroliferous Monterey Shale is evident on the eastern end of Santa Cruz Island.  The Chumash used the tar and oil from these seeps for caulking and adhesives.

Geography 
The islands within the park extend along the Southern California coast from Point Conception near Santa Barbara to San Pedro, a neighborhood of Los Angeles. Park headquarters and the Robert J. Lagomarsino Visitor Center are located in the city of Ventura.

 San Miguel 
 Santa Rosa 
 Anacapa 
 Santa Barbara 
 Santa Cruz  76% owned by the Nature Conservancy, 24% by the National Park Service

Climate

According to the Köppen climate classification system, Anacapa Island has a Warm-summer Mediterranean climate (Csb).

Geology
Weaver describes the geologic province of Anacapia as consisting of the islands of San Miguel, Santa Rosa, Santa Cruz, and Anacapa, plus the western portion of the Santa Monica Mountains.  The province is to the south of the Santa Barbara embayment, and north of the Catalinia geologic province.  Mesozoic in origin, the Anacapia province consists of Late Cretaceous to Miocene age marine sedimentary up to 23,000 feet thick, including 8,000 feet of volcanic rocks, overlain by Pleistocene terrace formations.  Aligned with the Santa Monica mountains, the Northern Channel Islands form a mountain system 130 miles long.  This island chain appears to be a faulted east-west trending anticline.  Major faults include the Santa Cruz Island Fault and the Santa Rosa Island Fault.

A stratigraphic column would start with the oldest rocks, the Santa Cruz Island schist, forming an elongated core of the island, 10 miles long and 1.5 miles wide.  This schist is intruded by the metamorphosed Alamos Tonalite, which has been dated 145 Ma.  Just to the south of this schist is the Willows Diorite, also of the same age as the tonalite, or Late Jurassic.  The only Cretaceous rocks consist of the Jalama Formation, found on San Miguel Island.

Lower Tertiary sequence of rocks are found within the Christi Anticline on the southwestern part of Santa Cruz Island.  The sequence includes the Pozo Formation, Canada Formation, Jolla Vieja Formation, and the Cozy Dell Formation.  San Miguel and Santa Rosa islands have the Middle to Late Eocene South Point Formation, while the Cozy Dell Formation is present on Santa Rosa, along with the Sespe Formation.

Middle Tertiary formations found on Santa Rosa and Santa Cruz include the Vaqueros Formation, while those two islands plus San Miguel have exposures of the Rincon Formation, and Monterey Formation.  Santa Rosa and San Miguel have exposures of the basaltic and dacitic San Miguel Volcanics, which include pillow structures, while the San Onofre Breccia is found on Santa Rosa, Santa Cruz, and Anacapa.  Santa Rosa Island Volcanics consist mainly of basaltic breccia, which erupted about 19 Ma.  San Miguel Volcanics consist of basalt and andesite flows, which erupted between 17-18 Ma.  Santa Cruz Island (SCI) Volcanics on the north side of the island consist of andesitic flows and volcaniclastics, overlying the San Onofre Breccia, and dated at about 16 Ma.  The eruptive center is east of Devils Peak, and juxtaposed against the west-northwest trending strike-slip Santa Cruz Island Fault to the south.  These 2400 m of SCI Volcanics have been further subdivide into four members, consisting of the lowermost Griffith Canyon, followed by Stanton Ranch, Devil's Peak, and Prisoner's Harbor, the uppermost.  The Griffith Canyon Member consists of basaltic and andesitic epiclastic volcanic breccias.  The Stanton Ranch Member consists of andesitic flows, flow breccias, and tuff breccias.  The Devil's Peak Member consists of scoriaceous andesitic and dacitic flows.  The Prisoner's Harbor Member consists of andesitic and dacitic transitional to rhyolitic flows, flow breccias, and tuffaceous volcaniclastic beds.  Middle Miocene Conejo Volcanics correlate with the bulk of Anacapa's lava flows, volcanic and volcaniclastic breccias, which consist of vesicular and porphyritic andesite erupting about 16 Ma.  About 1700 m are exposed, with two strata of San Onofre Breccia interbedded at the base.  Cores taken from the east end of the island are andesitic in composition.  Santa Barbara Island consists of basalt-basaltic andesite and andesite volcanic flows, which erupted 15-17 Ma.

During the Late Pleistocene, all of the islands were much closer to the mainland due to lower sea levels, and between 11,000 and 20,000 years BP, the islands remained connected to each other as Santa Rosae.  The Pleistocene mammoths swam to Santa Rosae.  However, the pygmy mammoth underwent dwarfing as the Channel Islands became isolated.  Another species which became extinct was the "giant" mouse.  Mammoth remains include those of Mammuthus columbi, while the remains of Mammuthus exilis have been found on San Miguel, Santa Rosa, and Santa Cruz, ranging in age from 12,840 to >47,000 YBP.  The 1994 Mammuthus exilis discovery on Santa Rosa near Carrington Point, was the first example of an in situ, almost complete, articulated skeleton.

Other geologic features of note on the islands include beachrock, eolianite, and caliche pseudomorphs.

Flora and fauna 

More than 2,000 species of plants and animals can be found within the park. However, only three land mammals are native to the islands, one of which is the deer mouse (Peromyscus maniculatus) which is known to carry the sin nombre hantavirus. The spotted skunk and Channel Islands fox also are native, with the fox endemic to the islands. The island fence lizard is also endemic to the Channel Islands. Other animals in the park include island scrub jay, harbor seal, California sea lion, island fox, spotted skunk, island night lizard, barn owl, American kestrel, horned lark and meadowlark and California brown pelican. One hundred and forty-five of these species are unique to the islands and found nowhere else in the world. Marine life ranges from microscopic plankton to the endangered blue whale, the largest animal on earth. Archeological and cultural resources span a period of more than 10,000 years.

Headquarters and mainland visitor center 
The visitor center is located in the Ventura Harbor. The visitor center contains several exhibits that provide information regarding all five islands, native vegetation, marine life and cultural history. Also, visitors can enjoy a short film, free of charge, that provides an overview of all five islands. The visitor center is open every day, except Thanksgiving and Christmas, from 8:30AM–5:00PM. The average annual visitation to the mainland visitor center was around 311,000 in the period from 2009 to 2018, with 366,250 visiting in 2018.

Recreation

Channel Islands National Park recreational activities include backpacking, camping, day hiking, scuba diving, and spearfishing. Channel Islands National Park is renowned for its large number of complex, beautiful sea caves. Kayaking through the sea caves is popular.

Based on ocean conditions and ferry availability, Scorpion Anchorage on Santa Cruz Island is the most visited area in the park for day and camping visitors. Camping visitors arrive at Prisoners Harbor on the north shore and stay in the valley beyond. A new island visitor center opened at Scorpion Ranch on Santa Cruz Island on April 6, 2009.

Although most visitation occurs in the summer, migrating gray whales and spectacular wildflower displays attract visitors in the winter and spring. Autumn is an excellent time to travel to the park, as well as for diving, as the days are usually sunny, with minimal winds and clear ocean water. 

It is recommended that inexperienced visitors use caution when visiting the national park due to changing ocean conditions in this unique ecosystem. The National Park Service authorizes a small number of guide and outfitter services.

Visitation to the islands and waters is low, with about 30,000 visitors traveling to the islands, and another 60,000 who only sail within park waters.

Gallery

Vessels 
The CINP unit operates several vessels in the waters of the park, including the following:
 Surf Ranger LCM-8 landing craft, 74 ft.
 research diving boat Pacific Ranger 56 ft.
 Sea Ranger II 58 ft.
 Ocean Ranger 100 ft.
 Sea Ranger 41 ft (retired).

See also 
 California coastal sage and chaparral ecoregion
 Channel Islands of California
 List of California Channel Islands wildlife
 List of national parks of the United States
 National parks in California
 When the Killing's Done – a novel by T.C.Boyle

References

External links 

 Official site: Channel Islands National Park
 NPS Public domain pictures of park

 
Channel Islands of California
Parks in Santa Barbara County, California
Parks in Ventura County, California
National parks in California
Biosphere reserves of the United States
Protected areas established in 1980
Articles containing video clips
1980 establishments in California